Deltatorquevirus is a genus of viruses in the family Anelloviridae, in group II in the Baltimore classification. It encompasses the single species of the Torque teno tupaia virus.

References

External links 
ICTV Virus Taxonomy 2009
UniProt Taxonomy
 
 ICTVdb
 ViralZone: Deltatorquevirus

Anelloviridae
Virus genera